Battle of the Brains was a Philippine quiz show which aired on RPN 9 from 1992 to 1999 and at PTV 4 from 2000 to 2001. Considered one of the most culturally influential locally produced shows of the 1990s, Battle of the Brains was open to all elementary, high school and college students nationwide.

It was hosted for almost all episodes by David Celdran, with various alternates (including Chiqui Roa-Puno, Cathy Santillan, and Anthony Suntay) taking over in his absence. It was primarily sponsored by Uniwide Sales, Inc. - a major budget retailer of that time- during the show's run on RPN 9 from 1992 to 1999. It was then sponsored by AMA Computer College during its brief run on PTV 4 from 2000 and 2001.

Tournament format
Competitors usually join by contacting Focal Media Arts by telephone, and are directly slotted for the televised Weekly Finals. However, there are also reports that non-televised provincial rounds have been held.
Each season determines its elementary, high school, and college level Grand Champions in a single-elimination tournament with 4 rounds (called the Weekly, Monthly, Quarterly, and Grand Finals). Only the top competitor advances to the next round.
The Weekly and Quarterly Finals feature 4 competitors each, while the Monthly and Grand Finals each field 3 competitors. However, there have been exceptions to this allocation for rounds prior to the Grand Finals.
Each competing elementary and high school is represented by 2 students (except for elementary teams from Seasons 1 and 2, which fielded 3 students each). The college competition featured an individual representing the school, except from Season 8 (1999–2000 season) onwards, when 2-person teams were adopted.
Alternates were allowed for elementary and high school competitors. But once used in competition, the alternate must continue to compete, taking the displaced student's place, for the rest of the competition.
In Season 9 (2000–2001 season), the format for the college level was changed to the returning-champion format similar to that of Jeopardy!. The winner will return on the next episode to face a new set of challengers until they get defeated.

Episode format
A panel of judges is present at every round, whose members are usually professors from top Philippine universities. Their primary function is to oversee and settle any disputes or complaints. Some of the competition's judges have been:

Mechanics for elimination rounds prior to Grand Finals, year 3 onwards:
Competition in each level was composed of 30 questions in total, grouped into 2 rounds of 15 questions each. Each round involved an equal number of questions asked in 5 subject areas: Science, Mathematics, History, General Information, and Arts/Literature.
The host reads the question twice, and is given some freedom to paraphrase the question. Contestants may answer as soon as the question is first read.
Contestants answered by buzzing in first, which when performed is accompanied by a unique light and sound display. The rostra are rigged with a lockout buzzing system: contestants buzzing in late will not generate the light and sound display. After buzzing, the host acknowledged the school and were given 5 seconds to answer correctly. If not, they forfeit the question and the other teams are given the chance to answer, subject to the same time constraints. For each question given, a team may only attempt to answer once. All contestants are given a chance to answer.
If no contestant attempts to buzz within 5 seconds (or within 30 seconds for math questions) after a question has been asked, the host announces the correct answer.
Points allotted for each question have varied, but generally the harder-category questions carry more points.
At the end of each round, the host recaps the scores and announces round leaders or winners.
In case of a tie for the winner, sudden-death questions were asked. The first team to answer correctly became the winner.
The winner of each round prior to the Grand Finals had the opportunity to answer 10 bonus questions within 1 minute and earn PHP 600 for each correct answer. From seasons 7 onwards the bonus round involved a 3-ring pattern board.

Difference in mechanics for elimination rounds prior to Grand Finals, years 1-2 (1993–94):
3 students per team in the elementary round, reduced to 2 students in season 3 but with total prizes unchanged.
Same 30 questions in total, but grouped into easy, average and difficult rounds of 10 questions each.
Only two contestants out of four are given the chance to answer. To prevent two contestants blocking the chances of the remaining two contestants, a score penalty is imposed in the difficult round for the second & subsequent wrong answers made. This penalty is waived after season 2 as all contestants get a chance to answer.

Mechanics for the Grand Finals and the ASEAN Invitational Finals are modified as follows:
Written-answer format with correct spelling required, and with no buzzers involved so all contestants can simultaneously score on each question.
No more bonus round after the winner is announced.  
Still 30 questions in total, grouped in the same manner as in the eliminations, equally weighted in the 5 subject areas mentioned above, and with sudden-death questions employed in case of a tie for the winner.
The competition also has a list of reference books which are used in settling disputes which are given to Grand Finalists. Since year 7 the books themselves are sometimes part of the Grand Prize.

In the 3-ring pattern board, the contestant chooses 1 of 3 concentric rings to accomplish, with the questions in each ring having a common theme (such as all answers beginning with the same letter, or of people from a particular field). Rings with more questions are found at the outermost portion of the set, and are generally easier to answer per question, while rings with fewer questions are at the center of the set are usually harder per question. Each question adds points to the total, while completing a ring merits extra prizes from show sponsors.

Complaints against questions, which may lead to score changes, are allowed during the actual taping of the show and are resolved with the decision of a panel of judges. But the actual protestations are not shown on air: the host simply summarizes the complaint and explains the score change.

Eligibility rules
Any school recognized by the Philippine Department of Education, Culture, and Sports (DECS; now known as DepEd) was eligible to compete. It must field students who are enrolled at the school at the designated level at the time the season starts. It is unknown whether Philippine schools abroad which are recognized by DECS were technically eligible.
For the elementary and high school levels, 1 alternate may be designated who will participate for the duration of the tournament once he or she is activated.
For the elementary and high school levels, a school may be represented only once during the entire tournament. At the college level, a school may be represented as often as possible, provided it has not yet reached the Grand Finals. Once a competitor from a school makes the Grand Finals, other contestants from the same school will not be allowed to compete.
As is common in televised academic quiz formats in the Philippines, which promote the 'give-chance-to-others' concept, an individual can become Grand Champion only once per level. This means that, for example, winning the elementary Grand Championship twice is not allowed, but winning 1 elementary and 1 high school Grand Championship is.

Venues
All rounds prior to the Grand Finals were recorded in Broadcast City, Quezon City. However, the Grand Finals were usually held at different auditoriums, including the following:

Prizes
For all rounds prior to the Grand Finals, points earned were paid out in Philippine peso for all contestants.

From Seasons 1 to 6, Grand Champions were awarded the following (in units of Philippine pesos, before 20% tax on prizes):

† - No coaches are formally recognized or awarded. Schools are recognized but are not given a separate prize. However, in reality, certain college competitors are given support or formal recognition by coaches and university officials.

In Seasons 7 and 8, most likely due to Uniwide Sales' financial troubles, the Grand Finals prize was paid ₱100,000 in cash and the balance in kind which included household appliances, encyclopedia sets and other books, and travel packages to destinations within the Philippines. The travel destination for the students may be different from that of the coaches.

From Seasons 1 through 7, all Grand Finalists were awarded plaques prior to taping, with the eventual Grand Champion getting another trophy at the conclusion of the Grand Finals. In Season 8, certificates were given for each round win prior to the Grand Finals, and a Grand Champion trophy was given at the conclusion of the Grand Finals.

Special Editions/Portions
Prior to the start of the elementary, high school, and college tournaments, the show may sometimes air Celebrity Edition episodes, where competitors are each composed of a television personality (usually female) and a college-level contestant (usually male). It may be observed during parts of the Celebrity Edition that the college contestant presses the buzzer and whispers the answer to the celebrity, who in turns provides the response to the host. The Celebrity Edition is not part of any tournament format.
In 1997, in celebration of the 30th anniversary of ASEAN, an ASEAN Invitational Battle of the Brains was aired on RPN 9, pitting the Season 5 Grand Champions against students from Indonesia, Singapore, Vietnam, Malaysia, and Thailand. The Philippine champions won at all levels.
From 1995 to 1997, a Mind Master portion was added to the program, in which college graduates (some of whom have previously competed as students) compete as individuals in a 2-competitor, returning-champion format. The winner gets to compete in the next episode until he or she gets defeated. Leonardo Gapol (Season 1 College Grand Finalist) was well known for winning 18 consecutive matches.

Grand Champions and Finalists

† - a change to the returning-champion format meant that there was no overall champion at the end of the season.

Mind Master
1996 10 Weeks - Kenneth Plamenco

1996 18 weeks? - Leonardo Gapol
1997-10-? - Richie Velasquez
1997 2 weeks Jose (Bong) Cruz Jr

1998 2 weeks - Ian  Vicente

Records and Notable Events

Most Grand Championships

School
Polytechnic University of the Philippines Sta. Mesa - 1995, 1997
University of the Philippines Diliman - 1998, 2000
La Salle Greenhills - 1998, 2000

Individual
Joseph Joemer Perez - 1995, 1998
Neil Tristan Yabut - 1999, 2000
Both attended the University of the Philippines Diliman.

Youngest Grand Champions respective to year level
Ferdinand Makalinao (1993) - freshman (year 1 of 7-year course)
Alfonso Gonzales III (1994) - freshman (year 1 of 4-year course)
Stanley Kristoffer Cabrera VI (2000) - freshman (year 1 of 5-year course)
Neil Tristan Yabut (2000) - freshman (year 1 of 4-year course)
All attended campuses of the University of the Philippines System.

Most Grand Finals appearances
Years in bold denote Grand Championship

School
Polytechnic University of the Philippines Sta. Mesa - 1994, 1995, 1996, 1997, 1999, 2000
University of the Philippines Diliman - 1997, 1998, 1999, 2000
University of the Philippines Manila - 1993, 1995
Philippine Academy of Sakya - 1993, 1995
Ateneo de Manila University - 1993, 1998
Lourdes School of Quezon City - 1998, 1999
Computronix College/Colegio de Dagupan - 1998, 1999
University of Santo Tomas - 1996, 2000
La Salle Greenhills - 1998, 2000

At different levels
Lourdes School of Quezon City - 1998 (High School), 1999 (Elementary)
La Salle Greenhills - 1998 (Elementary), 2000 (High School)

Individual
Christian Vasquez - 1993 (High School), 1995 (College)
Joseph Joemer Perez - 1995 (High School), 1998 (College)
Jonil Bautista - 1997 (High School), 1998 (College)
Neil Tristan Yabut - 1999 (High School), 2000 (College)
Bernard Vic Mendoza - 1999, 2000 (both Elementary, but representing different schools)

Most points

In 1 episode
Manila Science High School (Season 7 Weekly Finals, 1999-05-22) - 11,000

Prior to that, the record for the most number of points (9,900) was held by college contestant Orion Perez Dumdum during Season 1 Weekly Finals in November 1992. That score was supposed to be higher, but a buzzer malfunction prevented him from answering two questions he knew the answers to.

In 1 season
Manila Science High School (Season 7) - 11,000 + 10,700 + 10,000 + 8,800 = 40,500
During this scoring run, Manila Science perfected all 3 of their bonus rounds, and exceeded the combined score (4,100 + 3,100) of their rivals in the Grand Finals.

Other notables

Ferdinand Makalinao of UP Manila (Season 1) was known to perform math computations without using pen and paper.
Orion Perez Dumdum of Ateneo de Manila (Season 1) was known to be among the first contestants to buzz long before the host had finished reading the question & get it right, and quite often provided an accurate pronunciation of any foreign words and names.
Alfonso Gonzales of UPLB (Season 2) invested P300,000 (~$7,500) of his championship prize in an equity mutual fund which has since grown to P2.9 million (~$70,000) as of Nov. 2012.
All of the Season 5 Grand Champions also won their respective levels at the 1997 ASEAN Invitational.
The Season 5 competitors from Ramon Magsaysay High School included Roselle Ambubuyog, the visually impaired student achiever. They made it as fas as the monthly Championship.
? (Grade 6) and ? (Grade 5) Ortal were the only sibling team to join. They made it as far as the Season ? Quarterfinals representing Divine Light Academy - Bacoor

Sponsorship

At least during its first season in 1992, Battle of the Brains was produced in cooperation with the Philippine Department of Education, Culture, and Sports.
Various corporate sponsors have appeared on the shore at various times, including the following:
Colgate Mintirinse
Tru-Shine shoe shine
Negros Navigation
Milo
Tivoli Ice Cream
Goldstar
Strepsils Lozenges

Influence and legacy
Throughout its run, Battle of the Brains has become one of the most familiar and legendary quizbowl show in Philippine television, especially for students and trivia enthusiasts. In fact, the name of the show has been synonymous to any quiz competition in the Philippines, regardless of content and degree of TV coverage. Theresa Reyes Alvarez holds the copyright of "Battle of the Brains" with registration no. M 97-353.

Its level of fame during its time can be compared to those of the Kilometrico Quiz Date and Student Canteen's IQ7 in the 1960s-1970s, and the Digital LG Quiz in 1999–2004. It has also served as the model for various quiz competitions, televised or not, in the Philippines.

David Celdran's name has become strongly associated with the show. Winners at the show, especially in later stages and as Grand Champions, are known to have gotten celebrity attention within their school campuses.

The comedy show Tropang Trumpo parodied the show in a segment called Battle of the Brainless. In each episode, the competitors are said to come from schools whose names sound very similar to those of actual Philippine schools. Each question given by host is usually met by incorrect and humorous responses from competitors. The episode mostly ends in a tie for all schools. The host (usually portrayed by Ogie Alcasid) is also known to wear shorts, which is revealed as he moves away from his rostrum.

In David Celdran's recollection published March 2021 he expressed surprise at how people actually remember Battle of the Brains. He initially thought it will not survive the 1990s TV ratings competition since it was serious and scholastic, lacked showbiz gimmickry, was akin to a 90-minute IQ marathon, and had 30-second math problems which he joked as "television suicide". But what made the show entertaining, he recalled, were the geniuses onstage who became stars in their own right. He described the competition as a level playing field where “anyone could beat anyone” and many lesser known schools can challenge the elite schools and win the championships, "and that made it exciting because it wasn’t one-sided. It’s not like Ateneo wins basketball every year".

Awards

See also
List of programs previously broadcast by Radio Philippines Network
List of programs broadcast by People's Television Network

References

Philippine game shows
1992 Philippine television series debuts
2001 Philippine television series endings
1990s Philippine television series
Radio Philippines Network original programming
People's Television Network original programming
Filipino-language television shows
English-language television shows